Springfield is a town in Windsor County, Vermont, United States. As of the 2020 census, the population was 9,062.

History

The land currently recognized as Springfield is the traditional land of the Pennacook and Abenaki people.

One of the New Hampshire grants, the township was chartered on August 20, 1761 by Governor Benning Wentworth and awarded to Gideon Lyman and 61 others. Although Springfield's alluvial flats made it among the best agricultural towns in the state, the Black River falls, which drop 110 feet (33.5 m) in 1/8 of a mile (201 m), helped it develop into a mill town. Springfield was located in the center of the Precision Valley region, home of the Vermont machine tool industry.

In 1888, the Jones and Lamson Machine Tool Company (J&L) moved to Springfield from Windsor, Vermont under the successful leadership of James Hartness. Gaining international renown for precision and innovation, J&L ushered in a new era of precision manufacturing in the area. Edwin R. Fellows co-founded the Fellows Gear Shaper Company here in 1896. As knowledge and infrastructure grew to support precision machining, other companies such as the Bryant Chucking Grinder Company and Lovejoy Tool formed, grew, and provided much of the economic engine.

Springfield Telescope Makers, the oldest amateur telescope making club in the United States, has been based in Springfield since its inception in 1920 by Russell W. Porter. The club's pink clubhouse at the Stellafane Observatory was built in 1923 on Breezy Hill, just south of Springfield village, and has hosted an annual convention for astronomers and telescope makers nearly every summer since 1926. Many notable figures in the fields of astronomy and space exploration have attended the convention over the years.

During World War II, Springfield's production of machine tools was of such importance to the American war effort that the US government ranked Springfield (together with the Cone Automatic Machine Company of nearby Windsor) as the seventh most important bombing target in the country.

Springfield is also home to the Eureka Schoolhouse, the oldest one-room school in the state of Vermont. The school house was named by its first teacher, David Searle, who, after a long journey through the new frontier was heard to cry "Eureka!" upon reaching the new settlement of Springfield. The name stuck, and "Eureka" can still be found in street and business names throughout Springfield.

Several sites in Springfield, including the historic downtown area, have been designated as having historical significance according to the National Register of Historic Places. Among them are the Hartness House (original home of the entrepreneur and governor) and the Gould's Mill Bridge, a steel truss bridge.

On July 10, 2007, Springfield was selected to host the premiere of The Simpsons Movie, which, like the Simpsons TV show, is set in a town called Springfield. In a Fox competition, Vermont was chosen to host the opening for over 13 other places around the nation called Springfield.

Geography

According to the United States Census Bureau, the town has a total area of 49.5 square miles (128.1 km2), of which 49.3 square miles (127.7 km2) is land and 0.2 square mile (0.4 km2) (0.30%) is water. Bounded on the east by the Connecticut River, Springfield is drained by the Black River, which flows directly through downtown. The town includes the village of North Springfield.

Cultural and historic sites
 Eureka Schoolhouse (1790)
 Hartness Mansion (1903–1904)
 Springfield Art & Historical Society
 The Stellafane National Historic Landmark

Demographics

As of the census of 2000, there were 9,078 people, 3,886 households, and 2,498 families residing in the town.  The population density was 184.1 people per square mile (71.1/km2).  There were 4,232 housing units at an average density of 85.8 per square mile (33.1/km2).  The racial makeup of the town was 97.60% White, 0.24% African American, 0.14% Native American, 0.77% Asian, 0.06% Pacific Islander, 0.18% from other races, and 1.01% from two or more races. Hispanic or Latino of any race were 0.72% of the population.

There were 3,886 households, out of which 28.5% had children under the age of 18 living with them, 49.9% were married couples living together, 10.2% had a female householder with no husband present, and 35.7% were non-families. 30.5% of all households were made up of individuals, and 15.1% had someone living alone who was 65 years of age or older.  The average household size was 2.31 and the average family size was 2.84.

In the town, the population was spread out, with 23.3% under the age of 18, 6.4% from 18 to 24, 25.9% from 25 to 44, 25.4% from 45 to 64, and 19.0% who were 65 years of age or older.  The median age was 42 years. For every 100 females, there were 91.0 males.  For every 100 females age 18 and over, there were 87.9 males.

The median income for a household in the town was $34,169, and the median income for a family was $42,620. Males had a median income of $31,931 versus $23,019 for females. The per capita income for the town was $18,452.  About 8.3% of families and 9.8% of the population were below the poverty line, including 10.3% of those under age 18 and 11.4% of those age 65 or over.

Education
Springfield's public school system currently has two elementary schools, one middle school grades 6–8, and one high school grades 9-12. These schools are overseen by a five-member school board elected individually by staggered elections to three year terms. In 2006 the public technical school, the River Valley Technical Center, left the Springfield School District to form its own district. The Springfield School District is currently undertaking action to renovate its elementary schools. The School Board plans to expand Union Street School and Elm Hill School, while the voters decided in 2008 to cease using Park Street School as a school "As soon as possible" due to prohibitive refurbishment costs and safety issues.

Elementary and middle schools
The city's two public elementary schools are Elm Hill and Union Street Schools.

Riverside Middle School is the town's only public middle school (grades 6–8).

Springfield High School
Springfield High School is Springfield's only high school.

 Team Name: Cosmos
 School Colors: Green and White

River Valley Technical Center
The River Valley Technical Center is housed in the Howard Dean Education Center and is adjacent to Springfield High School.  The RVTC teaches technical courses to the students of Springfield and surrounding towns of Chester, Bellows Falls, Westminster, Ludlow and Charlestown.

Colleges and universities
Springfield is home to branches of the Community College of Vermont and the University of Vermont, which are housed in the Howard Dean Education Center.

Infrastructure

Transportation
Springfield is crossed by Interstate 91 (Exit 7 serves the town), U.S. Route 5 and Vermont routes 10, 11, 106 and 143. Connecticut River Transit's the Current (CRT) provides Springfield with public transportation by bus around town and to Bellows Falls, Ludlow and the White River Junction and Lebanon, New Hampshire areas.

Notable people 

 Daric Barton, first baseman with the Oakland Athletics
 George B. Burrows, Wisconsin state legislator 
 Henry W. Closson, U.S. Army brigadier general
 George M. Darrow, foremost American authority on strawberries 
 Edwin R. Fellows, machine-tool inventor, industrialist
 Walbridge A. Field, U.S. Representative
 Helen Hartness Flanders, collector of American folk music
 Ralph Flanders, machine-tool entrepreneur, banker, senator
 Albert Lovejoy Gutterson, Olympic gold medalist (long jump)
 Dudley C. Haskell, politician and merchant
 James Hartness, inventor, aviator and 58th governor of Vermont
 Dudley C. Haskell, U.S. Representative
 Charles B. Hoard, U.S. Representative 
 Bill Jackowski, professional baseball umpire 
 Joseph B. Johnson, 70th governor of Vermont
 Kenny Johnson, film and television actor
 Pattrice Jones, ecofeminist writer, educator, and activist
 James Kochalka, local cartoonist and rock musician
 Lewis R. Morris, U.S. Representative 
 Levi P. Morton, 22nd Vice President of the United States
 Alban J. Parker, Vermont Attorney General  
 Samuel B. Pettengill, U.S. Representative 
 Russell W. Porter, explorer, artist and telescope innovator
 Asahel Lynde Powers, painter 
 Paul W. Ruse Jr., Vermont State Treasurer 
 Edwin W. Stoughton, lawyer and diplomat 
 James Bates Thomson, mathematician, educator, and author 
 Wheelock G. Veazey, attorney, judge, and government official 
 Louis G. Whitcomb, United States Attorney for Vermont

References

External links

 Town of Springfield official website
 Springfield Vermont Chamber of Commerce

 
Towns in Vermont
Towns in Windsor County, Vermont